Bhoot Ka Darr is a Hindi horror film of Bollywood directed by S. Gawli and produced by Pankaj Johar. This film was released on 2 April 1999 in the banner of Kanti Shah's Gulab Films.

Plot
This film starts with the scene of a graveyard where a woman and her partner bury a dead body. She has killed her husband with the help of her paramour. Now the ghost of the betrayed husband seeks revenge on his adulterous wife.

Cast
 Rajesh Vivek
 Sapna
 Deepak Shirke
 Jyoti Rana
 Vinod Tripathi
 Kishore Bhanusali
 Anil Nagrath
 Arif Khan
 Bajrangi

References

External links
 

1999 films
1990s Hindi-language films
Hindi-language horror films
Indian horror films